The Journal of Infection Prevention is a bimonthly peer-reviewed medical journal that covers the field of infectious diseases. The editor-in-chief is Neil Wigglesworth (Public Health Wales). It was established in 2000 and is published by SAGE Publications on behalf of the Infection Prevention Society.

Abstracting and indexing 
The Journal of Infection Prevention is abstracted and indexed in:
 Academic Search Premier
 Applied Social Sciences Index and Abstracts
 British Nursing Index
 CINAHL
 EMBASE/Excerpta Medica
 Nursing Abstracts
 Pubmed Central
 Scopus

External links 
 
 Infection Prevention Society

SAGE Publishing academic journals
English-language journals
Microbiology journals
Bimonthly journals
Publications established in 2000